Cucumerunio is a genus of bivalves belonging to the family Hyriidae.

The species of this genus are found in Australia.

Species:

Cucumerunio novaehollandiae 
Cucumerunio websteri

References

Hyriidae
Bivalve genera